Tom Rath (born 1975) is an American consultant on employee engagement, strengths, and well-being, and author.  He is best known for his studies on strength-based leadership and well-being and for synthesizing research findings in a series of bestselling books. His books have sold more than 5 million copies and have been translated into sixteen languages.

Biography 
Rath holds a B.A. in Psychology from the University of Michigan, and an M.S. in Psychology from the University of Pennsylvania.

After his studies, Rath started working at Gallup, Inc., where he participates as a senior scientist, consultant, and advisor. He served as vice chairman of the VHL cancer research organization and is a regular guest lecturer at the University of Pennsylvania.

Work

Writing career 
Rath’s first book, How Full Is Your Bucket?, coauthored with his grandfather,  Donald O. Clifton, during his final year of life, became a New York Times bestseller in 2004. The book aims to teach children the value of "filling your bucket" and that people should also value every moment.

Strengths Based Leadership (2009), co-authored with Barry Conchie, is based on Rath’s and Gallup's research on leadership and on what followers expect from their leaders (trust, compassion, stability, hope).

Wellbeing: The Five Essential Elements (2010), a New York Times bestseller, coauthored with Jim Harter, is based on Gallup’s research on wellbeing. The book lists five elements of well-being: career well-being, social well-being, financial well-being, community well-being, and physical well-being.

Rath’s most well-known book, StrengthsFinder 2.0 (2007), a #1 Wall Street Journal bestseller, was listed as the top worldwide business bestseller by The Economist in 2011. It suggests that employees and employers should develop their unique skills rather than spend time improving their weaknesses.

Eat Move Sleep 

At the age of 16, Rath was diagnosed with VHL disease, a rare genetic disorder that causes cancer cells to appear in various parts of the body. Since the time of the diagnosis, Rath has been researching and experimenting with various ways of slowing down the growth of tumors in his kidneys, adrenal glands, pancreas, and spine.

In 2012, he took a sabbatical from his full-time position in Gallup to focus on writing a new book, titled Eat Move Sleep: How Small Choices Lead to Big Changes which became a New York Times bestseller upon its publication in October 2013. Eat Move Sleep was also recognized as one of the best nonfiction books of 2013 by Apple iTunes. It describes the impact of eating, moving, and sleeping on health and everyday energy and offers practical ideas on how to make better health choices.  The book emphasizes the interrelatedness of eating, moving, and sleeping and encourages focusing on all three in any health improvement program.

Publications, a selection 
2004 How Full Is Your Bucket? Positive Strategies for Work and Life, 
2006 Vital Friends: The People You Can't Afford to Live Without, 
2007 How Full Is Your Bucket? Positive Strategies for Work and Life. Educator's Edition, 
2007 StrengthsFinder 2.0, 
2009 How Full Is Your Bucket? For Kids, 
2009 Strengths Based Leadership: Great Leaders, Teams, and Why People Follow, 
2010 Wellbeing: The Five Essential Elements, 
2013 Eat Move Sleep: How Small Choices Lead to Big Changes, 
2020  Life's Great Question: Discover How You Contribute to the World,

References

External links 

Living people
University of Michigan College of Literature, Science, and the Arts alumni
University of Pennsylvania alumni
American male writers
1975 births